Ha-106 was an Imperial Japanese Navy Ha-101-class submarine. Completed and commissioned in December 1944, she served during the final months of World War II, participating in training activities and performing rescue duty off Japan for Japanese aircrews who came down at sea. She surrendered at the end of the war in September 1945 and was scuttled in April 1946.

Design and description

The Ha-101-class submarines were designed as small, cheap transport submarines to resupply isolated island garrisons. They displaced  surfaced and  submerged. They were designed to carry  of cargo.

For surface running, the boats were powered by a single  diesel engine that drove one propeller shaft. When submerged the propeller was driven by a  electric motor. They could reach  on the surface and  underwater. The boats were armed a single mount for a  Type 96 anti-aircraft gun.

Construction and commissioning

Ha-106 was laid down on 1 July 1944 by Kawasaki at Senshu, Japan, as Small Supply Submarine No. 4606. She was launched on 30 October 1944 and was named Ha-106 that day. She subsequently was towed to the Kawasaki shipyard at Kobe, Japan, for fitting-out. She was completed and commissioned at Kobe on 15 December 1944.

Service history

Upon commissioning, Ha-106 was attached to the Kure Naval District and assigned to Submarine Squadron 11 for workups. On 30 December 1944, she was reassigned to the Grand Escort Command, and after that she served in the Seto Inland Sea as a target for antisubmarine warfare training for kaibokan escort ship crews. On 20 January 1945, she participated in torpedo attack training with the aircraft carrier  and aircraft of the Imperial Japanese Navy Air Service′s 453rd Naval Air Group.

On 5 March 1945, Ha-106 was assigned directly to the headquarters of the 5th Air Fleet. She departed Kanoya, Japan, on 8 March 1945 to support Operation Tan No. 2 — a long-range kamikaze mission directed at the Allied naval fleet anchorage at Ulithi Atoll  — by operating off Minamidaitōjima as to rescue Japanese aircrews who ditched at sea during the operation. Reassigned to Submarine Division 33 for training purposes on 10 March 1945, she took part in Operation Tan No. 2 on 11 March. Records do not indicate whether she rescued any downed aircrews, but she did return to Kanoya that day, then resumed her operations off Minamidaitōjima for two more days of rescue duty. She wrapped up her participation in Operation Tan No. 2 with her arrival at Kanoya on 13 March 1945.

In April 1945, Ha-106 began conversion to a submarine tender for midget submarines. During August 1945, she moved to the Ourazaki area near Kure, Japan, where she began preparations for a one-way mission from Saeki, Japan, to attack Allied ships. She then proceeded to Kure.

Hostilities between Japan and the Allies ended on 15 August 1945, and on 2 September 1945, Ha-105 surrendered to the Allies at Kure. In November 1945, the U.S. Navy ordered all Japanese submarines at Kure, including Ha-106, to move to Sasebo, Japan.

Disposal
The Japanese struck Ha-106 from the Navy list on 30 November 1945. She was among a number of Japanese submarines the U.S. Navy scuttled off the Goto Islands near Sasebo in Operation Road's End on 1 April 1946.

Notes

References
 

 
 , History of Pacific War Extra, "Perfect guide, The submarines of the Imperial Japanese Forces", Gakken (Japan), March 2005, 
 Ships of the World special issue Vol.37, History of Japanese Submarines, (Japan), August 1993
 The Maru Special, Japanese Naval Vessels No.43 Japanese Submarines III, Ushio Shobō (Japan), September 1980, Book code 68343-43
 The Maru Special, Japanese Naval Vessels No.132 Japanese Submarines I "Revised edition", Ushio Shobō (Japan), February 1988, Book code 68344-36
 Senshi Sōsho Vol.88, Naval armaments and war preparation (2), "And after the outbreak of war", Asagumo Simbun (Japan), October 1975

Ha-101-class submarines
Ships built by Kawasaki Heavy Industries
1944 ships
World War II submarines of Japan
Maritime incidents in 1946
Scuttled vessels
Shipwrecks in the Pacific Ocean
Shipwrecks of Japan